Donath may refer to:

Ferenc Donáth (born 1954), a Hungarian Olympic gymnast
Fred A. Donath (born 1931), American geologist
Gyula Donáth (1850–1909), Hungarian sculptor
Helen Donath (born 1940), American soprano
Judith Donath (born 1962), professor at MIT's Media Lab
Ludwig Donath (1900–1967), Austrian-born US actor
Ursula Donath (born 1931), German athlete
Donath, Switzerland, a former municipality now part of Donat, Switzerland

See also
Donat (disambiguation)